Agnes of Landsberg (1192 or 1193 – 1266 in Wienhausen) was a German noblewoman.  She was the third child of Conrad II (1159–1210), Margrave of Lusatia, and his wife, Elisabeth ( – 1209), the daughter of Mieszko III the Old (1126–1202), Duke of Poland.  She was a daughter-in-law of Henry the Lion.

Life 
Agnes was the youngest daughter of the ruling family of Landsberg.  Her elder brother was Conrad (died before 1210); her sister was Matilda ( – 1225), who married Margrave Albert II of Brandenburg.  Agnes married in 1211 to Henry V, Count Palatine of the Rhine (1173 – 28 April 1277 in Brunswick), the eldest son of Henry the Lion.

Ersch and Gruber had this to say about Agnes and her husband:

Agnes died in 1266 and was buried in Wienhausen Abbey

Founding monasteries 
Between 1217 and 1221, a, probably wooden, Cistercian monastery was constructed on the lower reaches of the Burgdorfer Aue, near Nienhagen, and populated with nuns from the monastery in Wöltingerode.  This was an initiative of Henry and his wife Agnes.  The monastery no longer exists, but the place where it stood is still called  (i.e. "monastery court").  The place was infested by "water musquitos and poisonous worms" and suffered from "unhealthy, swampy air".  After about the years, the monastery was moved to Wienhausen.  In 1233, the Bishop of Hildesheim confirmed the rights of Wienhausen Abbey.

in 1243, Agnes founded a monk's monastery in Isenhagen.  It was later converted to the Cistercian Isenhagen Abbey.

Domus Ottonis 
Duke Otto the Child gave his aunt Agnes a house, named  (i.e. "Otto's house") in the city of Cell, with all the farmland and forests that belonged to it, with permission to leave the house and the lands to Wienhausen Abbey in her will.  This house was probably built as a hunting lodge for Otto when his aunt stille lived at Altencelle castle.  After Agnes's death, the house came into the possession of Wienhausen Abbey, who would rent it out.

References 
 Matthias Blazek, supported by Wolfgang Brandis, archivist of Lüneburg Abbey: Dorfgeschichte Ottenhaus — Eine Spurensuche, Celle, 2005
 Matthias Blazek: Nienhagen wurde als 'indagonoua' erstmals urkundlich genannt, in a bundle published on the occasion of the 75th anniversary of theSportverein Nienhagen 1928 e.V., 2003, p. 142 ff
 Jürgen Gedicke: Nienhagen – Geschichte eines niedersächsischen Dorfes, vol. 1, Nienhagen, 1990, p. 17 ff

External links

Footnotes 

Margravines of Germany
German countesses
12th-century births
1266 deaths
Year of birth uncertain
Place of birth unknown
13th-century German nobility
13th-century German women
Daughters of monarchs